Carl Berger may refer to:
 Carl Berger (cinematographer) (1901–1983), American cinematographer
 Carl Berger (historian) (born 1939), Canadian academic and author

See also
 Karl Berger (born 1935), German jazz pianist, composer, and educator
 Karl Berger (footballer) (born 1951), German footballer